State Route 319 (SR 319) is a very short, two-lane state highway in the western portion of the U.S. state of Ohio. A spur route, SR 319 has its western terminus at an abandoned railroad grade just west of Washington Street in the village of Burkettsville. SR 319 was established in the early 1930s. It started out as a much longer highway, but earlier segments would become a part of SR 118 in the late 1930s.

Route description
For its entire length, SR 319 runs along the boundary between Darke County on the south side and Mercer County on the north side. SR 319 begins in downtown Burkettsville at a former railroad grade just west of Washington Street.  Known as Main Street within Burkettsville, the route runs due east through the village's central business district prior to entering a residential area where it intersects a few side streets.  After leaving the village of Burkettsville, SR 319 becomes the boundary between Darke County's Allen Township and Mercer County's Granville Township.  After a short distance through farmland, the highway comes to an end as it arrives at its junction with SR 118. Continuing east after the route terminates is Darke–Mercer County Line Road.

The Ohio Department of Transportation (ODOT) conducts surveys throughout its highway system to determine traffic volume.  This is most commonly expressed as the average annual daily traffic (AADT), or the measure of traffic volume for any average day of the year.  In 2010, ODOT determined that an average of 710 vehicles per day traveled along the length of SR 319.  This state highway is not included as a part of the National Highway System, a system of highways identified as being most important for the economy, mobility and defense of the nation.

History
SR 319 was assigned in 1932. Originally, SR 319 included the entirety of the current route, along with the stretch of SR 118 from SR 319 north to SR 219 in Coldwater.  In 1935, SR 319 was extended further north along the present alignment of SR 118 to what was then designated as SR 32, now a part of SR 29, west of Celina.  Two years later, SR 118 was extended south from its former southern terminus in Rockford to its present southern terminus in Greenville.  Consequently, the entirety of what was the north–south stretch of SR 319 prior to that time became a part of the new extension of SR 118.  In turn, SR 319 became the short spur route that it is today.

Major intersections

See also

References

External links

319
Transportation in Darke County, Ohio
Transportation in Mercer County, Ohio
State highways in the United States shorter than one mile